Collin H. Woodward (? - September 7, 1927) was the Tax Commissioner of New York City and Republican district leader. He succeeded Daniel S. McElroy as Tax Commissioner of New York City.

Biography
He died on September 7, 1927 in an automobile accident near Poughkeepsie, New York.

References

1927 deaths
Poughkeepsie, New York
Tax Commissioners of New York City
Year of birth missing